Coastal Engineering Journal is a peer-reviewed scientific journal covering achievements and engineering practices in the fields of coastal, harbor and offshore engineering. The journal is published by Taylor & Francis, and is intended to cover "not only fundamental studies on analytical models, numerical computation and laboratory experiments, but also results of field measurements and case studies of real projects" .
It was founded in 1958 under the title Coastal Engineering in Japan, taking on its present name in the 1990s.

Abstracting and indexing
The journal is indexed in
 Science Citation Index Expanded
 ISI Alerting Services
 Cambridge Scientific Index
 Environment Abstracts
 CSA Selected Water Resources Abstracts
 CSA Oceanic Abstracts
 CSA Health and Safety Abstracts
 CSA Aquatic Sciences and Fisheries Abstracts (ASFA)
 Current Contents/Engineering, Computing and Technology
 Compendex

References

Engineering journals
Publications established in 1959
World Scientific academic journals
English-language journals